Ross Kennedy (born 25 September 1982 in Wellington, New Zealand) is a rugby union player who currently plays with .

Playing career

Kennedy was marked as a future star when he claimed a starting spot at lock for Wellington in the 2002 provincial rugby season, aged only 19. He earned a spot with the Hurricanes for the 2003 Super 12 season, and by 2004 was a starter for the Hurricanes as well.

His career continued on the ascendancy through the 2005 Super 12 season, where he started 12 games for the Hurricanes, scored two tries, and played some of the finest rugby of his career. However, from this point forward, he would be blighted by injuries and lose momentum. After missing much of the 2005 provincial season, he was limited to just 4 substitute appearances in the 2006 Super 14 season - his final appearances at that level - and found himself on loan to Counties Manukau for part of the 2006 Air New Zealand Cup.

Kennedy signed with Otago for the 2007 Air New Zealand Cup, but again found himself sidelined for most of the season with injury.  A healthier 2008 saw him selected to the Highlanders squad for the 2009 Super 14 season, although he failed to see any game action.

Kennedy signed with Hawkes Bay for the 2009 Air New Zealand Cup, where he would have his finest season in years as he started 14 games in helping the Magpies to the semi-finals of the competition. He continued as a regular starter through 2010.

References

New Zealand rugby union players
Living people
1982 births
Wellington rugby union players
Counties Manukau rugby union players
Otago rugby union players
Hawke's Bay rugby union players
Eastern Province Elephants players
Hurricanes (rugby union) players
Crusaders (rugby union) players
Rugby union players from Wellington City
Rugby union locks
People educated at Christchurch Boys' High School
New Zealand expatriate rugby union players
New Zealand expatriate sportspeople in South Africa
Expatriate rugby union players in South Africa